The 1911–12 Auburn Tigers men's basketball team represented Auburn University during the 1911–12 NCAA college basketball season. The head coach was Mike Donahue, coaching his seventh season with the Tigers.

Schedule

|-

References

Auburn Tigers men's basketball seasons
Auburn
Auburn Tigers
Auburn Tigers